Volosovo is a rural locality (a village) in Petushinskoye Rural Settlement, Petushinsky District, Vladimir Oblast, Russia. The population was 30 as of 2010. There are 6 streets.

Geography 
Volosovo is located 7 km east of Petushki (the district's administrative centre) by road. Starye Petushki is the nearest rural locality.

References 

Rural localities in Petushinsky District